Mythimna consanguis is a moth of the family Noctuidae first described by Achille Guenée in 1852. It is found in Sri Lanka, India, Korea, Indonesia and Australia.

Adult wingspan is 3 cm. Forewings brownish with patterned dark lines. A dark area is found near the middle. Hindwings white with darker margins.

References

External links
Molecular Phylogeny of Indonesian Armyworm Mythimna Guenée (Lepidoptera: Noctuidae: Hadeninae) Based on CO I Gene Sequences

Moths of Asia
Moths described in 1852
Hadeninae

Mythimnini